Mongolia–United States relations are bilateral relations between the United States and Mongolia.

According to a 2010 Gallup poll, Mongolians prefer the American leadership over that of China and India, with 58% expressing approval, 5% expressing disapproval, and 37% uncertain, and according to the 2012 U.S. Global Leadership Report, 44% of Mongolians approve of American leadership, with 6% disapproving, and 50% uncertain. Gallup's 2020 polls showed Mongolia was the top country in Asia supporting the US leadership performance. 

According to a 2017 survey, 82% of Mongolians have a favorable view of the United States (23% "strongly" and 59% "somewhat" favorable), with 10% expressing a negative view (1% "strongly" and 9% "somewhat" unfavorable).

As of 2014, there were 1,444 international students of Mongolian origin studying in the United States.

History
Due to Mongolia's previous close political and geographic ties with the USSR  throughout the Cold War, there has been limited direct historical contact between the United States and Mongolia prior to the end of the 20th century. However, some immigrants came from Mongolia to the United States as early as 1949, spurred by religious persecution in their homeland.

The U.S. government recognized Mongolia in January 1987 and established its first embassy in that country's capital Ulan Bator in June 1988. The U.S. embassy formally opened in September 1988. The first U.S. ambassador to Mongolia, Richard L. Williams, was not a resident there. Joseph E. Lake, the first resident ambassador, arrived in July 1990. Secretary of State James Baker visited Mongolia in August 1990, and again in July 1991. Mongolia accredited its first ambassador to the United States in March 1989. Secretary of State Madeleine Albright visited Mongolia in May 1998, and Prime Minister Nambaryn Enkhbayar visited the American capital Washington, DC in November 2001. Deputy Secretary of State Richard L. Armitage visited Mongolia in January 2004, and Mongolian President Natsagiin Bagabandi came to Washington for a meeting with President George W. Bush in July 2004. President Bush, First Lady Laura Bush, and Secretary of State Condoleezza Rice visited Mongolia in November 2005. Defense Secretary Donald Rumsfeld visited in October 2005 and Speaker of the House of Representatives Dennis Hastert visited Mongolia in August 2005. Agriculture Secretary Mike Johanns led a presidential delegation in July 2006 in conjunction with Mongolia's celebration of its 800th anniversary. President Enkhbayar visited the White House in October 2007 and the two Presidents signed the Millennium Challenge Compact for Mongolia (see below).

The United States has sought to assist Mongolia's movement toward democracy and market-oriented reform and to expand relations with Mongolia primarily in the cultural and economic fields. In 1989 and 1990, a cultural accord, Peace Corps accord, consular convention, and Overseas Private Investment Corporation (OPIC) agreement were signed. A trade agreement was signed in January 1991 and a bilateral investment treaty in 1994. Mongolia was granted permanent normal trade relations (NTR) status and Generalized System of Preferences (GSP) eligibility in June 1999.

In July 2004, the U.S. signed a Trade and Investment Framework Agreement with Mongolia to promote economic reform and more foreign investment. In July 2007, six members of the U.S. House of Representatives visited Mongolia to inaugurate an exchange program between lawmakers of the two countries. The return visit came in August 2007, with five members of the Mongolian Parliament traveling to the U.S. In September 2007, the White House announced the proposed creation of an Asia-Pacific Democracy Partnership, in which Mongolia was invited to take part. The initiative is aimed at providing a venue in which free nations can work together to support democratic values, strengthen democratic institutions, and assist those who are working to build and sustain free societies.

In 2012, the two countries celebrated their 25th anniversary of diplomatic relations.

In early 2021, it was found in a declassified secret document that Mongolia holds a strategic importance to the US in advancing the Indo-Pacific region.

U.S. assistance
The U.S. Agency for International Development (USAID) plays a lead role in providing bilateral development assistance to Mongolia. The program emphasizes one major theme: sustainable, private sector-led economic growth and more effective and accountable governance. Total USAID assistance to Mongolia from 1991 through 2008 was about $174.5 million, all in grant form. USAID Mongolia's FY 2007 budget of $6.625 million a year promotes: a) economic growth that support macroeconomic policy reform, energy sector restructuring, financial sector reform, and micro and small enterprise development; and b) governing justly and democratically by focusing on activities supporting judicial sector reform, electoral reform, parliamentary reform, and anti-corruption.

In most years since 1993, the United States Department of Agriculture has provided food aid to Mongolia under the Food for Progress and 416(b) programs. The monetized proceeds of the food aid ($4.2 million in 2006) are currently used to support programs bolstering entrepreneurship, herder livelihood diversification, and better veterinary services.

Mongolia has contributed small numbers of troops to coalition operations in Iraq and Afghanistan since 2003, gaining experience which enabled it to deploy armed peacekeepers to both United Nations and NATO peacekeeping missions in 2005. With U.S. Department of Defense assistance and cooperation, Mongolia and the U.S. jointly hosted "Khan Quest 06," the Asian region's premier peace-keeping exercise, in the summer of 2006 and "Khan Quest 07" a year later. The U.S. has also supported defense reform and an increased capacity by Mongolia's armed forces to participate in international peacekeeping operations. Mongolia has also been designated as a "global partner" of the NATO alliance, of which the U.S. is a founding member, through the Individual Partnership and Cooperation Programme approved in 2012.

The Peace Corps has approximately 100 volunteers in Mongolia. They are engaged primarily in English teaching and teacher training activities. At the request of the Government of Mongolia, the Peace Corps has developed programs in the areas of public health, small business development, and youth development. In 2005 and 2006 Mongolian Government officials, including President Enkhbayar and Prime Minister Tsakhiagiin Elbegdorj, requested significant increases in the number of volunteers serving in country. The Peace Corps has responded with a commitment to make modest annual increases until 2010. The program celebrated its 15th anniversary in 2006 with participation by President Enkhbayar.

The Millennium Challenge Corporation (MCC) completed negotiations for a Compact with Mongolia  in 2007 and the Compact was signed at the White House in October 2007. By the end of the compact in September 2013, the Government of Mongolia and MCC had spent 94 percent of the anticipated compact funds to increase land security, reduce impacts of non-communicable diseases and injuries, provide enhanced vocational training, expand distribution of energy-efficient household products, and construct roads for commercial traffic. The Government of Mongolia and MCC expect more than 2 million people to benefit from the investments over the 20-year lifetime of the investment. In December 2014, the MCC Board of Directors selected Mongolia for the development of a second compact.  Currently, MCC and Mongolian officials are conducting an analysis of the country's economy and constraints to growth.

In August 2011, on a side trip while traveling to China and Japan, Joe Biden made the first visit by a sitting vice president to Mongolia since Henry Wallace made one in 1944.

In 2020, the U.S. government provided 1.2 million USD through U.S. Agency for International Development to the World Health Organization and the United Nations Children's Fund to support the Mongolian government's response to the COVID-19 pandemic.

Economic interests
In March, 2011, six mining companies including Peabody of St. Louis, Missouri were preparing a bid for the Tavan Tolgoi area, the location of a substantial coking coal deposit.

Biden's 2011 visit, according to Richard C. Bush of the Brookings Institution, may be able to encourage Mongolia's democracy and U.S. relations in the face of both Mongolia's predominantly natural-resource-driven political economy and its two powerful landlocking neighbors, China and Russia.

Following Joe Biden's campaign in the U.S. presidential elections in 2020, who said that he would take measures against the "dirtiest coal", the U.S. administration may look into renewable energy development in Mongolia, which could help the country's economy diversify away from coal productions.

Diplomatic missions
The current Ambassador to Mongolia is Richard Buangan, who was appointed by President Joe Biden on November 17, 2022. He was preceded by Michael S. Klecheski, who was appointed by President Donald Trump on January 2, 2019. Jennifer Zimdahl Galt was the Ambassador to Mongolia from September 15, 2015, to November 10, 2017. Piper Campbell was the U.S. Ambassador to Mongolia from 2012 to 2015, succeeding Jonathan Addleton.

Since March 23, 2018, the Ambassador from Mongolia to the USA is Yondon Otgonbayar, who succeeded Bulgaa Altangerel. He presented diplomatic credentials on March 28, 2018.

See also
 Diluwa Khutugtu Jamsrangjab
 Mongolian Americans

References

Further reading
 Campi, Alicia, R. Baasan, et al. The Impact of China and Russia on United States-Mongolian Political Relations in the Twentieth Century (2009)
 Campi, Alicia Jean. The Political Relationship between the United States and Outer Mongolia, 1915-1927: Kalgan Consular Records (Indiana UP, 1987).
 Dumbaugh, Kerry, and Wayne M. Morrison. Mongolia and US Policy: Political and Economic Relations (Congressional Research Service, 2007) online.
 Porter, Ron A. "Realpolitik in Mongolia-US relations." Ritsumeikan Journal of Asia Pacific Studies' 26.1 (2009): 49–63. online

External links

 History of Mongolia–U.S. relations

 
United States
Bilateral relations of the United States